Lagenaria rufa is a squash plant. It is a climbing vine. Its flowers range from white to yellow. The fruit is a gourd, dark green when developing but becomes cream-orange when ripe. It is native to western Africa.

External links
 Lagenaria rufa

Cucurbitoideae